Reef Net Bay is a bay in the U.S. state of Washington. 

The creek was formerly called Squaw Bay.  The original name had caused a degree of controversy over its "racist" name, cf. squaw. The present name is after reef nets used by local fishermen.

References

Bays of Washington (state)
Landforms of Okanogan County, Washington